The Wallace Stevens Journal is an academic journal established in 1977 and the official publication of The Wallace Stevens Society. It covers the works and life of the American modernist poet Wallace Stevens. The journal is published twice a year by the Johns Hopkins University Press.

External links
 
 The Wallace Stevens Society

Biannual journals
Literary magazines published in the United States
English-language journals
Johns Hopkins University Press academic journals
Publications established in 1977
Stevens, Wallace
1977 establishments in the United States